Charles-Hubert Gervais (19 February 1671 – 14 January 1744) was a French composer of the Baroque era. The son of a valet to King Louis XIV's brother, Monsieur, Gervais was born at the Palais Royal in Paris and probably educated by Monsieur's musical intendants, Jean Granouillet de Sablières and Charles Lalouette. He worked as a musician for the Duc de Chartres, the future regent of France. In 1701, he married Françoise du Vivier (she died in 1723). In 1721 he was named sous-maître de musique at the Chapelle royale along with André Campra, Nicolas Bernier and Michel Richard Delalande (who had previously held the post alone). Gervais composed sacred music, 42 grans motets, 7 petits motets, cantatas, and operas, including two tragédies en musique.

Works

Operas
Idille sur le retour du duc de Chartres (1692)
Méduse (tragédie en musique, 1697)
Divertissement de Fontainebleau (1698, attributed to Gervais)
Hypermnestre (tragédie en musique, 1716)
Les amours de Protée (opéra-ballet, 1720)
Divertissement de Villers-Cotterêts (1722)

Discography 

 Hypermnestre, Katherine Watson, Hypermnestre, Mathias Vidal, Lyncée, Thomas Dolié, Danaüs, Philippe-Nicolas Martin, Arcas (ombre de Gélanor, le Nil), Chantal Santon-Jeffery, (NaÏade, bergère, Coryphée), Juliette Mars, (Isis, matelote), Manuel Munez Camelino (Grand Prêtre, Coryphée), Purcell Choir, Orfeo Orchestra, conducted by Giörgy Vashegyi. 2 CD Glossa 2019. 5 Diapasons.
 Grand motets - Exaudi Deus, O filii et filiae, Judica me Deus, Uquequo Domine, Te Deum, Purcell Choir, Orfeo Orchestra, conducted by György  Vashegyi. CD Glossa 2022. 5 Diapasons
 Grands motets, Jubilate Deo, Super flumina Babylon, Misere, Choeur du Concert Spirituel, Les Ombres, conducted by Sylvain Sartre. CD CVS 2022. 5 Diapasons

Sources
 Charles-Hubert Gervais, Super flumina Babilonis. Edited by Jean-Paul C. Montagnier. “Recent  Researches in the Music of the Baroque Era” no. 84. Madison, WI: A.R. Editions, Inc., 1998.
 Charles-Hubert Gervais,  Miserere. Ed. Jean-Paul C. Montagnier. Stuttgart: Carus-Verlag, 2004
 Jean-Paul C. Montagnier,"Charles-Hubert Gervais’s Psiché burlesque and the Birth of the Comic Cantate française," The Journal of Musicology 17 (1999): 520-545.
 Jean-Paul C. Montagnier,Charles-Hubert Gervais (1671-1744), un musicien au service du Régent et de Louis XV. Paris: CNRS Editions, 2001.
 Jean-Paul C. Montagnier, “Les deux versions du cinquième acte d’Hypermnestre de Charles-Hubert Gervais,” Revue de musicologie, 82 (1996), pp. 331-343.
 Jean-Paul C. Montagnier, “Claude Boyer librettiste: remarques sur Méduse,” Revue d’histoire du théâtre 191 (1996), pp. 303–320.

External links

See also
List of French composers

1671 births
1744 deaths
French Baroque composers
French male classical composers
French opera composers
Male opera composers
18th-century classical composers
18th-century French composers
18th-century French male musicians
17th-century male musicians